Kilmory is a hamlet in the civil parish of South Knapdale, on Knapdale, Argyll and Bute, Scotland. It is situated near the mouth of Loch Sween on its southern shores. In 1961 it had a population of 81.

Three schools, established by the Society in Scotland for Propagating Christian Knowledge (SSPCK), existed here in the 19th century.

References

Villages in Knapdale